Ohayon may refer to:

Almog Ohayon (born 1994), Israeli footballer
Amandine Ohayon, CEO of Pronovias, a wedding dress design business in Spain
Ayelet Ohayon (born 1974), three-time Olympian Israeli foil fencer
Haviv Ohayon (born 1998), Israeli footballer
Henry Ohayon (born 1934), Israeli cyclist
Jonathan Ohayon (born 1972), athlete from Canada, grandson of writer Joseph Liss
Matan Ohayon, retired Israeli footballer
Michèle Ohayon (born 1968), film director, screenwriter and producer
Moshe Ohayon (born 1983), Israeli former professional football midfielder
Shimon Ohayon (born 1945), Israeli politician, professor at Bar-Ilan University
Yogev Ohayon (born 1987), Israeli professional basketball player